The 2021 Kawardha riots were incidents of religious violence between Hindus and Muslims that occurred in Kawardha, Chhattisgarh, India, between 3 and 7 October 2021.

Background 
Kawardha is a small city in the Kabirdham district of Chhattisgarh. It is the home of former state Chief Minister Raman Singh and Forest Minister Mohammad Akbar. The district is 92.4% Hindu and 7.76% Muslim.

Incident 
On Sunday, 3 October 2021, a group of Muslims and Hindus had an argument over the placement of religious flags in Loahara Naka Chowk in the town of Kawardha. An eyewitness claimed that following the altercation, a green flag had been torn down, and some hours later, a saffron flag was removed in retaliation. Two days later, right-wing organisations, including the Vishva Hindu Parishad and the Bajrang Dal, held a rally protesting the flag removal. The rally led to civil unrest in the region, including arson and rioting. The police conducted a lathi charge to disperse the protestors, invoked Section 144 (barring unlawful assembly) of the Indian Penal Code, and imposed a curfew in the region. 

The police stated that the Vishva Hindu Parishad and the Bajrang Dal had promised peaceful protests. They registered a First Information Reports against several people, including Santosh Pandey, a Member of Parliament, and Abhishek Singh, a former Member of Parliament, both of whom were from the Bharatiya Janata Party.

References

Citations

Sources

External links 

 

2021 crimes in India
2021 riots
Arson in India
Attacks on buildings and structures in India
Attacks on buildings and structures in 2021
Religiously motivated violence in India
Crime in Chhattisgarh
Religious riots
October 2021 events in India
October 2021 crimes in Asia
Anti-Muslim violence in India
Riots and civil disorder in India
Hinduism-motivated violence in India